For the mountain peak Blåhøi in Innlandet, Norway, see Blåhøi.

Blåhøa (or Blåhø) is a mountain in the municipality of Oppdal in Trøndelag county, Norway. It is the highest mountain at the northeastern side of the Trollheimen mountain range.

Name
The first element is blå which means "blue", and the last element is hø(a) which means a "large and round mountain".

References

Oppdal
Mountains of Trøndelag